The following lists events that happened during 1981 in Iraq.

Incumbents
 President: Saddam Hussein
 Prime Minister: Saddam Hussein
 Vice President: Taha Muhie-eldin Marouf

Events

January
 January 5 - For the first time since Iraq had invaded its territory in September, Iran launched a counterattack, concentrating its armies at Sousangerd. After 18 months, Iraqi forces had been driven out of Iran, which then began a drive toward capturing Iraqi territory. The war would continue until 1988.

References

 
Years of the 20th century in Iraq
Iraq
Iraq